Champions Universe is a supplement published by Hero Games/Iron Crown Enterprises (I.C.E.) in 1992 for the superhero role-playing game Champions.

Contents
Champions Universe is a 186-page softcover book written by Monte Cook and 95 other authors, with illustrations by Storn Cook and Scott Heine. The book is a compilation of background information about the Champions universe. Material covered includes:
 timelines
 unusual places of the world
 brief outlines of major magicians and high technology agencies
 a summary of alien races
 the Paranormal Registration Act
 updates of the Champions super-team
 thumbnail sketches of the world's main organizations and media groups
 new villains 
 a glossary of characters 

An adventure scenario is also included.

Reception
In the September 1993 edition of Dragon (Issue #197), Allen Varney thought this book "succeeds fairly well", although he noted "shaky spelling and grammar." But Varney questioned the utility of the book: "While reading this book I kept asking, 'What does this accomplish? Who needs it?' If you already have a campaign, much of this book becomes redundant. If you can’t devise a campaign world of your own, the material here seems (a) too sketchy to help much and (b) not thought through." He concluded, "Even if you do need a pre-fab super campaign, Champions Universe won’t fill the role without other supplements to prop it up."

Reviews
White Wolf #35 (March/April, 1993)
Pyramid

References

Alternate history role-playing games
Campaign settings
Champions (role-playing game) supplements
Role-playing game supplements introduced in 1992